Should a Girl Marry? is a 1939 American crime film directed by Lambert Hillyer and written by David Silverstein and Gaye Newberry. The film stars Anne Nagel, Warren Hull, Mayo Methot, Weldon Heyburn, Aileen Pringle and Lester Matthews. The film was released on June 8, 1939, by Monogram Pictures.

Plot

Cast           
Anne Nagel as Margaret
Warren Hull as Dr. Robert Benson
Mayo Methot as Betty Gilbert
Weldon Heyburn as Harry Gilbert
Aileen Pringle as Mrs. White
Lester Matthews as Dr. White
Helen Brown as Mary Winters
Sarah Padden as Mrs. Wilson
Gordon Hart as Mr. Wilson
Edmund Elton as Dr. Turner
Robert Elliott as Warden
Claire Rochelle as Hysterical Patient
Arthur Loft as Dr. Garfield
Harry Hayden as Dr. Willard
Bess Flowers as Nurse

References

External links
 

1939 films
American crime films
1939 crime films
Monogram Pictures films
Films directed by Lambert Hillyer
American black-and-white films
1930s English-language films
1930s American films